The Smurfs have appeared in five feature-length films and two short films loosely based on The Smurfs comic book series created by the Belgian comics artist Peyo and the 1980s animated TV series it spawned. They theatrically debuted in a 1965 animated feature film that was followed by a 1976 animated film titled The Smurfs and the Magic Flute. Twenty-eight to thirty years after The Magic Flute was released in the United States, a 2011 feature film and a 2013 sequel were produced by Sony Pictures Animation and released by Columbia Pictures. Live-action roles include Hank Azaria, Neil Patrick Harris, and Jayma Mays, while the voice-over roles include Anton Yelchin, Jonathan Winters, Katy Perry, and George Lopez. A fully animated reboot titled Smurfs: The Lost Village was released through Sony in April 2017.

Films

Films produced in Franco-Belgium

Les Aventures des Schtroumpfs (1965)

The film consists of five black-and-white shorts made in the previous years for broadcasting on Walloon TV: Smurfnapped: A Smurf gets himself captured by Gargamel. Now, the rest of the Smurfs must save him before he gets killed.; The Smurfs and the Magic Egg: The Smurfs discover a magic egg. But they don't know it has been created by Gargamel.; The Black Smurfs: A contagious disease terrorizes the village.; The Smurfs and the Dragon: The Smurfs befriend a domesticated dragon.; The Flying Smurf: One of the Smurfs attempt to fly like a bird.

The Smurfs and the Magic Flute (1976)

This story is set at a castle during the Middle Ages. One day a merchant brings musical instruments to sell to Peewit, the court jester, but because Peewit is such a terrible musician the King throws the merchant out before Peewit arrives. However, he has left behind a flute that only has six holes. The King throws it into the fireplace in his room, which starts to emit green smoke. When the fire is put out, Peewit retrieves the flute from the ashes unharmed. He cleans it and starts playing it for the whole castle realizing that it causes everyone to dance when it is played.

That night a man named Matthew McCreep learns from the merchant that the same flute he had been looking for is at the castle. He heads over to the castle and steals the flute from Peewit. The king sends Peewit and the young knight Johan out to catch McCreep who uses the flute to rob people of their money. However, McCreep uses the flute to stop them. Johan and Peewit then go to the house of Homnibus the wizard. Using a spell called Hypnokinesis, the wizard sends Johan and Peewit to Smurfland where the magic flute was built.

Upon arriving they meet a smurf who leads them to the village. Papa Smurf greets the two of them and tells them that they'll make a new flute in order to counter McCreep's flute. The smurfs head into the forest and chop down a huge tree to get wood from the tree trunk's very center as only this kind of wood can be useful in crafting a magical flute. Afterward, they celebrate with a party. However, just as Papa Smurf is about to give the flute to Johan and Peewit, the two are warped back to the wizard's house. Homnibus tries the spell again but passes out from a headache.

Meanwhile, McCreep, who has now stolen over 7,000 gold pieces, arrives at the castle of his secret partner, Earl Flatbroke. McCreep tells Flatbroke of his plan to go to an island to hire people for an army to raise war on the King's castle; fortunately, two Smurfs had been listening to this. Back at the wizard's house, the Smurfs regroup with Johan and Peewit and give them the magic flute. Then they head to the port of Terminac where McCreep sets sail for the island. However, they are too late. Papa Smurf tells Johan and Peewit about Flatbroke's castle and Johan comes up with a plan.

Flatbroke receives a letter from McCreep (written by Johan) to come to the island. He heads over to Terminac to board a ship where Johan and Peewit are also on board in disguise as well as Papa Smurf and 3 others. They head to the island where Johan and Peewit tail Flatbroke. Suddenly Peewit comes face to face with McCreep and they both start playing their flutes to each other. They both become exhausted soon after, but Peewit knocks out McCreep with a final note.

With McCreep and Flatbroke being brought back to the castle and all the stolen money recovered, Peewit now has two magic flutes. Johan tells him that the flutes are dangerous and must be brought back to the Smurfs, but Peewit begins to carve a phony flute to give to them instead. At the castle, Johan and Peewit give the flutes back to the smurfs, and after they leave, Peewit starts playing the flute, only to realize (to his horror) that it has no effect on the townsfolk; it is the fake flute he had made!

Films produced in America

Sony Pictures Animation films (2011–2017)

The Smurfs (2011)

The Smurfs is a 2011 live-action/computer-animated comedy film and the first CGI film in the series and was directed by Raja Gosnell. In their race to escape the malevolent wizard Gargamel, the little blue forest dwellers find themselves suddenly transported to Central Park. Now stuck in a world populated by towering giants, the Smurfs must find a way to elude Gargamel and find a way back to the village they call home.

The Smurfs 2 (2013)

A sequel titled The Smurfs 2 was released on July 31, 2013. Director Raja Gosnell and producer Jordan Kerner returned, along with all of the main cast. New cast members include Christina Ricci, J. B. Smoove and Brendan Gleeson. In the sequel, Gargamel creates a couple of evil Smurf-like creatures called the Naughties to harness the magical Smurf-essence. When he discovers that only a real Smurf can give him what he wants and that only Smurfette can turn the Naughties into real Smurfs, Gargamel kidnaps her and takes her to Paris. Papa, Clumsy, Grouchy, and Vanity return to the human world and seek the help of their friends Patrick and Grace Winslow to rescue Smurfette from Gargamel. It was Jonathan Winters' final film after his death on April 11, 2013.

Cancelled third live-action/animated film
By May 10, 2012, just two weeks after production of The Smurfs 2 was announced, Sony Pictures Animation and Columbia Pictures had already been developing a script for The Smurfs 3, with writers Karey Kirkpatrick and Chris Poche. Hank Azaria, who played the live-action Gargamel, said that the third film "might actually deal with the genuine origin of how all these characters ran into each other way back when." In March 2014, Sony announced that, instead of a third live action film, it would be rebooting the series with a completely computer-animated film.

Smurfs: The Lost Village (2017)

Smurfs: The Lost Village is a 2017 American 3D computer-animated fantasy adventure comedy film produced by Sony Pictures Animation and The Kerner Entertainment Company for Columbia Pictures. Kelly Asbury was hired to direct the animated film. Exploring the origins of Smurfs, the comedy-adventure features a new take on the characters, with designs and environments more closely following the artwork created by Peyo. The film was initially set to be released on August 14, 2015, but in May 2014, the film's release date was pushed back to August 5, 2016. In January 2015, The Hollywood Reporter reported that Mandy Patinkin was in final negotiations to voice Papa Smurf in the film. Two months later, the release date had been pushed back to March 31, 2017, in order to work on "a story that was not fully in the place," and take advantage of the Easter weekend. On June 14, 2015, Sony Pictures Animation revealed Get Smurfy as title of the film. In addition to Patinkin, Demi Lovato was cast as Smurfette, and Rainn Wilson as Gargamel. The film was ultimately released on April 7, 2017, to mixed reviews, but was seen by both critics and audiences as an improvement over the live action films.

Short films

The Smurfs: A Christmas Carol

A television special, titled The Smurfs: A Christmas Carol was released on DVD on December 2, 2011, attached to The Smurfs.

The Smurfs: The Legend of Smurfy Hollow

The Smurfs: The Legend of Smurfy Hollow is a 22-minute animated Halloween television special, based on the Washington Irving's short story The Legend of Sleepy Hollow. It premiered on June 11, 2013, at the Annecy International Animated Film Festival, and was released on DVD on September 10, 2013, followed by a TV premiere in October. It was directed by Stephan Franck, and it features the voices of Alan Cumming, Fred Armisen, Anton Yelchin and Hank Azaria. Like the first special, The Legend of Smurfy Hollow combines computer-generated animation and traditionally hand-drawn animation, with the latter provided by Duck Studios.

Paramount Pictures films

Untitled Smurfs animated film
On February 7, 2022, it was reported that LAFIG Belgium and IMPS, the owners of the Smurfs brand, had agreed to a partnership with Paramount Animation and Nickelodeon Movies to produce multiple The Smurfs movies.

Cast and characters

 A gray cell indicates the character did not appear in that medium.

Crew

Reception

Box office performance

Critical and public response

References

External links

 
Film franchises introduced in 2010
Films based on Belgian comics
Comedy film series
Fantasy film series
Children's film series
Columbia Pictures franchises
Sony Pictures Animation franchises
Film series based on comics